Iontocaine was an anesthetic medication, marketed under the two brand names Numby and Phoresor PM900 by IOMED inc.  It is a local anesthetic with vasoconstrictor, administered via iontophoresis through the skin.  It can numb up to 10 mm of skin in as little as 10 minutes.  It is a 2% lidocaine, 0.01 mg/ml epinephrine solution.  It was manufactured by IOMED, Inc. 

Iontocaine was approved by the United States Food and Drug Administration on 21 December 1995.  It was discontinued by the manufacturer in 2005.

References

External links
 IOMED Numby web page from the Internet Archive
 Iontocaine Package Insert from the Internet Archive
 FDA page on iontocaine

Local anesthetics
Combination drugs